The Presbytery of Albany is a member of the PCUSA Synod of the Northeast.

The leadership of the Presbytery of Albany is:

Moderator: The Reverend Amauray Tañon-Santos
Vice Moderator: 
President of the Board of Trustees: Ruling Elder Carl Hasselbarth
Stated Clerk: The Reverend David Bennett 
Executive Presbyter: Ruling Elder Robert Trawick

It includes churches in Albany, Amsterdam, Ballston Spa, Broadalbin, Brunswick (Troy), Cambridge, Carlile, Charlton, Cohoes, Corinth, Delmar, Esperance, Fort Edward, Glens Falls, Granville, Greenwich, Guilderland, Hoosick Falls, Hudson, Hudson Falls, Jewett, Johnstown, Lake George, Lake Luzerne, Lansingburgh, Loudonville, Malta, Mayfield, Menands, Middleburgh, Northville, Poultney, Vermont, Putnam Station, Rensselaer, Rensselaerville, Salem, Saratoga, Schaghticoke, Schenectady, Schoharie, Scotia, Shushan, Slingerlands, Spencertown, Stephentown, Tribes Hill, Troy, Valatie, Warrensburg, Waterford, West Charlton, West Hebron, Whitehall.

References

External links 

Presbyterian Church (USA) presbyteries